The 2019 World Wheelchair Curling Championship was held from March 3 to 10 at The Peak in Stirling, Scotland.

Qualification
The following nations qualified to participate in the 2019 World Wheelchair Curling Championship:
  (host country) 
 Top eight teams from the 2017 World Wheelchair Curling Championship
 
 
 
 
 
 
 
  
 Top three teams from the 2018 World Wheelchair-B Curling Championship

Teams
The teams are listed as follows:

Round-robin standings
Final round-robin standings

Round-robin results
All draw times are listed in Greenwich Mean Time (UTC±0).

Draw 1
Sunday, March 3, 14:00

Draw 2
Sunday, March 3, 19:00

Draw 3
Monday, March 4, 9:00

Draw 4
Monday, March 4, 14:00

Draw 5
Monday, March 4, 19:00

Draw 6
Tuesday, March 5, 9:00

Draw 7
Tuesday, March 5, 14:00

Draw 8
Tuesday, March 5, 19:00

Draw 9
Wednesday, March 6, 9:00

Draw 10
Wednesday, March 6, 14:00

Draw 11
Wednesday, March 6, 19:00

Draw 12
Tuesday, March 7, 9:00

Draw 13
Thursday, March 7, 14:00

Draw 14
Thursday, March 7, 19:00

Draw 15
Friday, March 8, 9:00

Draw 16
Friday, March 8, 14:00

Draw 17
Friday, March 8, 19:00

Playoffs

Qualification games
Saturday, March 9, 13:00

Semi-finals
Saturday, March 9, 19:00

Bronze medal game
Sunday, March 10, 10:00

Final
Sunday, March 10, 14:30

See also
2019 World Wheelchair-B Curling Championship

References

External links
Official website

Wheelchair Curling Championships
World Wheelchair Curling Championship
World Wheelchair Curling Championship
Curling in Scotland
World Wheelchair Curling Championships
World Wheelchair Curling Championship